Mesazhieri  is a business newspaper published in Albania. It is published by No & Al, edited by Ilir Pjetra Ndue Bush. Lately it became an investigative newspaper, published by "Gimaj Construction" sh.pk, and directed by Ndue Pjetra

References

Defunct newspapers published in Albania
Albanian-language newspapers
Publications with year of disestablishment missing
Publications with year of establishment missing